Nikolai Dmitriyevich Zlobin (born 14 May 1996) is a Russian football player. He plays for FC Chelyabinsk.

Club career
He made his debut in the Russian Premier League for FC Arsenal Tula on 3 October 2020 in a game against FC Tambov.

References

External links
 
 
 

1996 births
People from Lobnya
Sportspeople from Moscow Oblast
Living people
Russian footballers
Association football defenders
FC Rubin Kazan players
FC Olimp-Dolgoprudny players
FC Saturn Ramenskoye players
FC Arsenal Tula players
FC Khimik-Arsenal players
Russian Premier League players
Russian Second League players